The Women's United States Squash Open 2013 is the women's edition of the 2013 United States Open (squash), which is a WSA World Series event Platinum (prize money: $115 000). The event took place at the Daskalakis Athletic Center in Philadelphia, Pennsylvania in the United States from the 13th of October to the 18 October. Nicol David won her second US Open trophy, beating Laura Massaro in the final.

Prize money and ranking points
For 2013, the prize purse was $115,000. The prize money and points breakdown is as follows:

Seeds

Draw and results

See also
United States Open (squash)
WSA World Series 2013
Men's United States Open (squash) 2013

References

External links
WSA US Open 2013 website
US Squash Open official website

Squash tournaments in the United States
Women's US Open
Women's US Open
2013 in American sports
2013 in women's squash
Squash in Pennsylvania